Svetlana Albertovna Tchernousova; born 18 September 1970) is a Russian former biathlete.

Honours 
 Biathlon World Championships
  Gold medal in relay in 2000, at the Biathlon World Championships 2000
  Gold medal in relay in 2003, at the Biathlon World Championships 2003
 Biathlon World Cup
 1 victory in World Cup events

External links
 

1970 births
Living people
Russian female biathletes
Place of birth missing (living people)